Sarach Yooyen (born 30 May 1992) is a Thai professional footballer who plays as a defensive midfielder for Thai League 1 club BG Pathum United and the Thailand national team.

Club career

BG Pathum United
Before joining BG Pathum United in August 2020, Yooyen made 162 league appearances in total at Muang Thong United, scoring nine goals.

The last Thai League 1 appearance that Yooyen made came on March 28 for BG Pathum United against Muang Thong United a game that he played 89 minutes in during a 1-0 defeat. Unfortunately for both Yooyen and BG Pathum United, he was sent off in this match. In total, the midfielder has recorded four Thai League 1 assists this season the second most for his side. He has been booked five times, as well as sent off twice.

Sarach Yooyen is a BG Pathum United midfielder who has made 28 appearances in this season's Thai League 1 with 24 of these coming for his current club. He had previously played for Muang Thong United in the competition during 2020.

International career

Youth
Sarach Yooyen played for Thailand U23 in the 2011 SEA Games. He represented Thailand U23 in the 2014 Asian Games. He won the 2015 SEA Games with Thailand U23, which he captained.

Senior
In November 2013, Yooyen debuted for Thailand playing against Kuwait in the 2015 AFC Asian Cup qualification. He was part of Thailand's winning squad for the 2014, 2016 2020 2022 AFF Championship consequently.

Style of play 
Yooyen is usually deployed by his club and national sides as a central midfielder, in the role of a deep-lying playmaker, due to his vision and passing accuracy.

Career statistics

Club

International goals

Senior 
Scores and results list Thailand's goal tally first.

U23

Honours

Club
Muangthong United
 Thai Premier League (2): 2012, 2016
 Thai League Cup (2): 2016, 2017
 Thailand Champions Cup (1): 2017
 Mekong Club Championship (1): 2017

BG Pathum United
 Thai League 1 (1): 2020–21
 Thailand Champions Cup (2): 2021, 2022

International
Thailand U-16
 AFF U-16 Youth Championship (1): 2007

Thailand U-19
 AFF U-19 Youth Championship (1): 2009

Thailand U-23
 Sea Games  Gold Medal (1): 2015
 BIDC Cup (Cambodia) (1): 2013

Thailand
 AFF Championship (4): 2014, 2016, 2020, 2022
 King's Cup (1): 2016

Individual
AFF Championship Best XI: 2022
 2016 AFF Championship: Best Eleven
Thai League 1 Goal of the Month: March 2022, October 2022

References

External links

1992 births
Living people
Sarach Yooyen
Sarach Yooyen
Association football midfielders
Sarach Yooyen
Sarach Yooyen
Sarach Yooyen
Sarach Yooyen
Sarach Yooyen
Sarach Yooyen
Sarach Yooyen
Footballers at the 2014 Asian Games
Sarach Yooyen
Southeast Asian Games medalists in football
Competitors at the 2015 Southeast Asian Games
Sarach Yooyen